Aka Khel or Akakhel is an area of Landi Kotal Tehsil, Khyber Agency, Federally Administered Tribal Areas, Pakistan located in the Tirah Valley.

Census Information 
As of 2017, the population in the region is 73,681.

References

Populated places in Khyber District